Emma Wood State Beach is a California State Beach in Ventura, California. It is located on the Santa Barbara Channel on the west side of the Ventura River estuary and south of the railroad tracks of the Coast Line and the US Highway 101 freeway. 

The beach is named after Emma Grubb Wood who once owned the  Taylor Ranch. The beach is popular for walking, fishing, swimming, and surfing. It also includes a primitive campground for recreational vehicles and the remains of World War II artillery emplacements.

History

The park is named for Emma Grubb Wood (May 23, 1881-September 19, 1944). Wood was the daughter of Alice Taylor Grubb, the owner of the Taylor Ranch (originally the Rancho Cañada de San Miguelito), an 8,000-acre sheep ranch on which oil was discovered in the 1930s. When Alice Taylor Grubb died in 1936, she left the ranch to her daughter Alice and son Percy. Percy, who was unmarried, committed suicide in December 1937 by carbon monoxide poisoning in a garage owned by Emma Wood's husband, Adrian "Buddy" Wood.

Wood died in 1944 in Carpinteria. At the time of her death, her land holdings, which included the Taylor Ranch, were valued at $8 million.  She was buried at Ivy Lawn Cemetery in Ventura.

Adrian Wood inherited the Taylor Ranch from Emma, and in 1956, Adrian, gave land totaling  with 7,600 feet of ocean frontage to the State of California. The land became the Emma Wood State Beach, which opened in 1957.

Features
Emma Wood State Beach is popular for walking, fishing, swimming, and surfing.

The Wood property and the adjoining Seaside Wilderness Park (owned by the City of Ventura) include multiple ecosystems, including sand dunes, a flood plain, cobblestone beach, riparian woodland, and wetlands. At the eastern edge of the beach, the Ventura River estuary attracts a variety of wildlife, including great blue herons. A total of 300 plant species and 233 species of birds have been identified in the area. The Ocean's Edge Trail runs through both the Wood and Seaside properties. Dolphins are also sometimes seen off the coast from the beach; the Los Angeles Times in 1997 wrote that Emma  Wood is the "best bet" for dolphin watching.

The beach includes the remains of two artillery installations built in 1942 in response to the Bombardment of Ellwood, a Japanese submarine attack on the Ellwood Oil Field.

The park also include a primitive campground for recreational vehicles. There are no sewage, water, or electricity connections, and no tent camping is allowed.

Gallery

See also
California State Beaches

List of California beaches
List of California state parks

References

External links

Official Emma Wood State Beach website

California State Beaches
Parks in Ventura County, California
Beaches of Southern California
Campgrounds in California
Surfing locations in California
Protected areas established in 1957
1957 establishments in California
Beaches of Ventura County, California